Rondebosch East is a residential suburb of Cape Town, South Africa, about  south-east of the city centre. A large common, similar to but smaller than nearby Rondebosch Common, is located in the center of the suburb.

Governance
Rondebosch East lies within ward 60 of the City of Cape Town metropolitan municipality; the current ward councillor is Mark Kleinschmidt of the Democratic Alliance. The ward in turn forms part of the Athlone & District Subcouncil.

Geography
Rondebosch East borders on Athlone to the north and east, Crawford to the east, Lansdowne to the south, and Rondebosch to the west. The boundaries of the area recognised as Rondebosch East in the 2001 Census lie along the M5 freeway (Kromboom Parkway), Mosman Road, the Cape Flats Railway Line, and Lawson Road.

Demography
The 2011 census recorded the population of Rondebosch East as consisting of 4,633 people. Of these, 52.7% were female and 47.3% male. 51.0% described themselves as "Coloured", 18.5% as "Indian or Asian", 12.3% as "Black African" and 9.4% as "White". 84.4% spoke English as their first language, 8.1% spoke Afrikaans and 2.6% spoke Xhosa.

Transport
Kromboom Road is the main road through Rondebosch East, connecting it to Rondebosch and Crawford, and to the M5 freeway at exit 13. Crawford railway station on the Cape Flats Line is located on the eastern edge of the suburb.

Education
Rondebosch East Primary School previously Alpha Primary is located centrally in Rondebosch East; Windsor High School is located just outside the suburb in Lansdowne.

Prominent Residents
Nizaam Carr - South African rugby union footballer.

References

Suburbs of Cape Town